The Riceville Community School District is a rural public school district serving the town of Riceville and surrounding areas in eastern Mitchell County and western Howard County.

The school, which serves all grade levels PreK-12 in one building, is located at 912 Woodlawn in Riceville.

Barb Schwamann has been the superintendent since 2017, while also serving as superintendent for Osage Community School District.  She was nominated for the 2019-20 Iowa Superintendent of the Year award.

The school's mascot is the Wildcats. Their colors are red and black.

Schools
Riceville Elementary School
Riceville High School

Riceville High School

Athletics 
The Wildcats compete in the Iowa Star Conference, including the following sports:

Cross County (boys and girls)
Volleyball 
Football
 1993 Class A State Champions 
Basketball (boys and girls)
Wrestling 
 1994 Class 1A State Champions
 1994 Class 1A State Duals Champions 
Track and Field (boys and girls)
Golf (boys and girls)
Baseball 
Softball

See also
List of school districts in Iowa
List of high schools in Iowa

References

External links
 Riceville Community School District

Education in Howard County, Iowa
Education in Mitchell County, Iowa
School districts in Iowa